South Korea have participated in the ABU Radio Song Festival four times. The Korean broadcaster, KBS 2FM, has been the organiser of the Korean entry since the country's debut in the contest in 2012.

History
KBS 2FM is one of the founder members in the ABU Radio Song Festivals, having participated in the very first ABU Radio Song Festival 2012.

Participation overview 
Table key

See also 
 South Korea in the ABU TV Song Festival

References 

Countries at the ABU Song Festival